Two referendums were held in France on 6 September 1795: one adopting the Constitution of the Year III establishing the Directory, and another on the Two-Thirds Decree reserving two-thirds of the seats in the new Council of Five Hundred and Council of Ancients for former members of the National Convention.

Constitutional Referendum

The official result was more than 95% in favor of the new constitution.

Two-Thirds Decree Referendum

Of the seven million eligible voters, only 4.49% of voters cast valid votes.

References

Referendums in France
1795 events of the French Revolution
1795 referendums
Constitutional referendums in France
French Directory
1795 elections in France